Eustace Hamilton (born 14 August 1969), better known as Thriller U, is a Jamaican reggae singer-songwriter.

Biography
Thriller U was born Eustace Hamilton in Kingston, Jamaica, 14 August 1969. While attending the Spanish Town Secondary School in St. Catherine Jamaica, his interest in music and songwriting started to develop.

Discography
Albums
Young Single And Fresh (1987), Vena Recordings
The Danger (1989), Jammy's Records
On & On (1989), Mixing Lab
Crazy (1989), Penthouse Records
Hilary (1989), Pioneer Muzik	
Drive (1992), Polydor Records
Best Of Me (1993), World Records	
Love Rule (1995), VP Records
All About You (1995), Overheat Records
No Surrender (1996), Cutting Edge
Drive +3 Dubs (1997), Polydor Records
Wana B Free (1998), Cutting Edge
Youth (1999), Cutting Edge
Silky Smooth (2003), Angella	

Split albums
Too Good to be True (with Admiral Tibet) (1989), Blue Mountain
Thriller U & Sanchez (with Sanchez) (1996), Record Factory
The Very Best (2000), Super Power Records

References

External links

Thriller U on Instagram

Jamaican reggae musicians
Jamaican male singers
1969 births
Living people
musicians from Kingston, Jamaica
VP Records artists